Eneas Perdomo (July 11, 1930 – February 25, 2011) was a Venezuelan popular singer. He was one of the most recognized singer/songwriters of the Venezuelan Joropo genre.

Early years
Eneas Perdomo was born El Yagual, a town in the state of Apure, in Venezuela in 1930. His parents were Vicente Perdomo and Rosa Carrillo. As a youngster, he worked in the typical occupations of a man from the Venezuelan plains: cow herdsman, farm hand and truck driver.

Main body of work
He got his start in radio in the state of Guárico. His first recording, made in the late 1950s,  was a poem by Cesar Sánchez Olivo entitled Soga, Despecho y Alero.  He went on to record more than 40 LPs and wrote many songs which have become Joropo standards. His best known song is Fiesta en Elorza a celebration of the festivities of the town of Elorza in the state of Apure.

He received a lot of honors (more than 200), among them the Orden del Libertador, Orden Ricardo Montilla, Orden Emilio Sojo, Orden Sol Del Perú. He had a plaza dedicated to him, and a street named after him by the town of Elorza, who named him Illustrious Son.

Death
Eneas Perdomo died at the Military Hospital located in the city of Caracas, after a long illness.

Selected Compositions
A Barinas
El Regional
El Verdun
Fiesta en Elorza
Flor Sabanera
La gaviota
Lia
Paisaje Apureño
Periquera
Pescador del Río Apure
Puente Sobre Apure
Recuerdos Llaneras
Sabanas de Aráuca
Sabanera
Semana Santa en Achaguas
Vestida de Garza Blanca / Alcaraván Compañero

See also 
Music of Venezuela

References

1930 births
2011 deaths
Venezuelan composers
Male composers
Venezuelan folk singers